Zhao Guisheng (born 1 January 1961) is a Chinese sport shooter who competed in the 1996 Summer Olympics.

References

1961 births
Living people
Chinese male sport shooters
Trap and double trap shooters
Olympic shooters of China
Shooters at the 1996 Summer Olympics
Shooters at the 1986 Asian Games
Asian Games medalists in shooting
Asian Games bronze medalists for China
Medalists at the 1986 Asian Games
20th-century Chinese people